I Will Fear No Evil is a science fiction novel by American writer Robert A. Heinlein, originally serialised in Galaxy (July, August/September, October/November, December 1970) and published in hardcover in 1970.  The title is taken from Psalm 23:4.

Plot summary

The story takes place in the early 21st century against a background of an overpopulated Earth with a violent, dysfunctional society. Elderly billionaire Johann Sebastian Bach Smith is being kept alive through medical support and decides to have his brain transplanted into a new body. He advertises an offer of a million dollars for the donation of a body from a brain-dead patient. Smith omits to place any restriction on the sex of the donor, so when his beautiful young female secretary, Eunice Branca, is killed, her body is used. He changes his name to Joan Eunice Smith, with the first name given "the two-syllable pronunciation" Jo-Ann to mimic the sound of his original name.

After Smith awakens after the transplant, he discovers he can communicate with Eunice's personality. They agree not to reveal her existence, fearing that they would be judged insane and locked up. Smith's identity is unsuccessfully challenged by his descendants, who hope to inherit his fortune. Smith and Eunice decide to have a baby together and so they (Joan and Eunice) are artificially inseminated using Smith's sperm from the sperm bank. Joan explores her new sexuality at length. She goes to visit Eunice's widower, Joe Branca, to help reconcile him to what has happened.

Joan marries her lawyer, Jake Salomon, and moves her household and friends onto a boat. Jake has a massive rupture of a large blood vessel in his brain and dies, but his personality is saved and joins Smith and Eunice in Joan's head. She (Joan, Eunice and Jake) emigrate to the Moon to find a better future for her child. Once there, her body starts to reject her (Smith's) transplanted brain. She dies during childbirth, but the various personalities apparently meet in the newborn child's brain.

Writing

Heinlein suffered from life-threatening peritonitis after completing the first draft of this novel. He remained ill for the next two years and the book is thought to have been published without his usual editing and polish.

Accolades

The novel was voted the ninth best science fiction novel of 1970 by readers of Locus magazine.

References

External links 
 
 
 I Will Fear No Evil parts one, two, three, and four on the Internet Archive

American science fiction novels
1970 American novels
1970 science fiction novels
Novels by Robert A. Heinlein
Novels first published in serial form
Works originally published in Galaxy Science Fiction
G. P. Putnam's Sons books
Dystopian novels
Overpopulation fiction
Brain transplantation in fiction
Novels set on the Moon